Zakumikhinskaya is a rural locality (a village) in Plesetsky District, Arkhangelsk Oblast, Russia. The population was 3 as of 2010. There are 3 streets.

Geography 
Zakumikhinskaya is located 51 km southwest of Plesetsk (the district's administrative centre) by road. Tarasovo is the nearest rural locality.

References 

Rural localities in Plesetsky District